DumbLand is a series of eight animated shorts written, directed and voiced by director David Lynch in 2002. The shorts were originally released on the Internet through Lynch's website, and were released as a DVD on March 28, 2006. The total running time of all eight shorts combined is approximately a half-hour.

The series details the daily routines of a dull-witted white trash man. The man lives in a house along with his frazzled wife and squeaky-voiced child, both of whom are nameless as is the man in the shows. Lynch's website, however, identifies the male character by the name Randy and the child by the name Sparky. The wife is not named.

The style of the series is intentionally crude both in terms of presentation and content, with limited animation.

Production
Each three-minute episode took Lynch ten days to make. The soundtrack was created at his home using a computer and he drew the animation with a mouse.

List of episodes

References

External links
 DumbLand at The City Of Absurdity
 Dumbland-Doc by Agnieszka Jurek

2002 animated films
2002 films
2000s American animated films
2002 short films
2000s animated short films
American adult animated web series
American black comedy films
American comedy web series
Short films directed by David Lynch
Films with screenplays by David Lynch
Internet memes
Film and television memes